Ciona is a genus of sea squirts in the family Cionidae.

The body of Ciona is bag-like and covered by a tunic, which is a secretion of the epidermal cells. The body is attached at a permanent base located at the posterior part, and the opposite bears two openings, the buccal (oral) and atrial (cloacal) siphons. The water is drawn into the ascidian through the buccal siphon and leaves the atrium through the atrial siphon.

Species
Species in this genus include:

 Ciona antarctica 
 Ciona edwardsi 
 Ciona fascicularis 
 Ciona gelatinosa 
 Ciona hoshinoi 
 Ciona imperfecta 
 Ciona intermedia 
 Ciona intestinalis 
 Ciona longissima 
 Ciona mollis 
 Ciona pomponiae 
 Ciona robusta 
 Ciona roulei 
 Ciona savignyi 
 Ciona sheikoi

Genome projects
As of 2008, the genomes of Ciona intestinalis and Ciona savignyi have been sequenced.

Sexual reproduction
C. intestinalis is a hermaphrodite that releases sperm and eggs almost simultaneously into the surrounding seawater. C. intestinalis is self-sterile and thus has been used for studies on the mechanism of self-incompatibility. C. savigny is highly self-fertile, but non-self sperm out-compete self-sperm in fertilization competition assays. Mechanisms promoting non-self fertilization may have evolved to avoid inbreeding depression, and to facilitate outcrossing which allows the masking of deleterious recessive mutations.

References

External links
The Tunicate Portal, an access point to the main websites and databases dealing with tunicates
Ascidians.com, pictures of species around the world
ANISEED, a model organism database for several ascidians species including Ciona intestinalis and Halocynthia roretzi
JGI Ciona intestinalis v2.0, genome sequence

Enterogona
Tunicate genera